John Clere may refer to:

 John Clere (by 1479–1539), English Member of Parliament (MP) for Colchester 1512 and 1515
 John Clere (c. 1511–1557), English sailor and Member of Parliament (MP) for Bramber 1542 and 1545, Thetford March 1553 and Norfolk 1555